Parapercis simulata is a fish species in the sandperch family, Pinguipedidae. 
It is found in the Red Sea and the Western Indian Ocean.

References

Goren, M. and M. Dor, 1994. An updated checklist of the fishes of the Red Sea (CLOFRES II). The Israel Academy of Sciences and Humanities, Jerusalem, Israel. 120 p. 

Pinguipedidae
Taxa named by Leonard Peter Schultz
Fish described in 1968